Hana Šromová (born 10 April 1978 in Kopřivnice) is a Czech former tennis player.

Šromová won eight singles and 35 doubles titles on the ITF Women's Circuit in her career. On 19 June 2006, she reached her best singles ranking of world No. 87. On 24 July 2006, she peaked at No. 63 in the doubles rankings.

Personal 
Šromová was coached by Lubomír Gerla for the last six years. Her father, Jiří Šrom, is a construction technician; her mother Hana is a kindergarten teacher; she has one brother, Jiří. Šromová started playing tennis at age seven, introduced to the sport by her parents, who both played tennis. Favorite surface is indoor hardcourts; biggest weapon is forehand. Most memorable experience was traveling to India for a tournament.

Šromová played her last match on the professional tour in 2008, she retired 2014.

ITF finals

Singles (8–10)

Doubles (35–24)

Grand Slam performance timelines

Singles

Doubles

External links
 
 

1978 births
Living people
Czech female tennis players
People from Kopřivnice
Sportspeople from the Moravian-Silesian Region